The Hunan–Jiangxi Soviet was a constituent part of the Chinese Soviet Republic, an unrecognised sovereign state that existed from November 1931 to 1935 (arguably continuing on from its new capital at Yan'an). Before that declaration of overarching statehood, the area was known as the Hunan-Jiangxi Revolutionary Base.

Government & Geography
The Revolutionary Base headquarters and later constituent Soviet administrative centre was at Lianhua County in the present-day Pingxiang municipal region.

Lianhua lies in the Luoxiao Mountains, running roughly north-south between the two provinces. The range also nestled the famous Jinggangshan redoubt of the anti-Rightist troops of the abortive Autumn Harvest Uprising of 1927.

Civil War Battles
The Hunan–Jiangxi Soviet's main armed force was known as the South-Eastern Hunan Red Army Independent Division. Until March 1931 it had been known as the Eastern Hunan Red Army Independent Division.

The Soviet successfully defended itself against a series of Nationalist Government attacks from January 29 to March 24, 1931, known as the Encirclement Campaign against Hunan-Jiangxi Soviet.

Moving out in August 1934, the Soviet's military (by now designated Sixth Army Group) crossed the Xiang River and climbed into the Miao-nation (Hmong-nation) mountain homeland, there to join in October the forces of the Hunan-Hubei-Sichuan-Guizhou Soviet. The combined force under general He Long was redesignated the Second Front Red Army.

References

External links 

Former socialist republics
Chinese Soviet Republic
States and territories established in 1931